Alex McCrindle (3 August 1911 – 20 April 1990) was a Scottish actor. He was best known for his role as General Jan Dodonna in Star Wars.

Biography

McCrindle was born in Glasgow, Scotland. He began his acting career in 1937 starring in minor roles in UK Television. From 1946 to 1951 he played the role of Jock Anderson in Dick Barton – Special Agent. In 1951 he starred in his first film in the USA, The House in the Square. From there his acting career took off. He then did five more films: I Believe in You (1952), The Kidnappers (1953), Trouble in the Glen (1954), Geordie (1955) and Depth Charge (1960).

From 1962 to 1974 he went to television acting. In 1976 he was cast as General Jan Dodonna in the first Star Wars film. He went back to minor roles on TV, including the role of the eccentric veterinarian Ewan Ross on All Creatures Great and Small.

Personal life
McCrindle's second wife was the children's novelist and political activist Honor Arundel (1919–1973). He was survived by his three children. According to Doris Lessing, McCrindle and Arundel's home in the 1950s was a hub of Communist Party activity and organisation.

Filmography

Film

Television

References

External links
 

1911 births
1990 deaths
British communists
Scottish male film actors
20th-century Scottish male actors
Male actors from Edinburgh
Male actors from Glasgow